Ceriops is a genus of mangroves in family Rhizophoraceae.

There are 5 accepted species and 17 known synonyms.

List of species
 Ceriops australis (C.T.White) Ballment, T.J.Sm. & J.A.Stoddart 
 Ceriops tagal var. australis C.T.White synonym of Ceriops australis (C.T.White) Ballment, T.J.Sm. & J.A.Stoddart 
 Ceriops decandra (Griff.) W.Theob. 
 Ceriops candolleana Náves synonym of Ceriops decandra (Griff.) W.Theob. 
 Ceriops roxburghiana Arn. synonym of Ceriops decandra (Griff.) W.Theob. 
 Ceriops pseudodecandra Sheue, H.G.Liu, C.C.Tsai & Yuen P.Yang 
 Ceriops tagal (Perr.) C.B.Rob. 
 Ceriops boviniana Tul. synonym of Ceriops tagal (Perr.) C.B.Rob. 
 Ceriops candolleana Arn. synonym of Ceriops tagal (Perr.) C.B.Rob. 
 Ceriops candolleana var. sasakii Hayata synonym of Ceriops tagal (Perr.) C.B.Rob. 
 Ceriops candolleana var. spathulata Blume synonym of Ceriops tagal (Perr.) C.B.Rob. 
 Ceriops forsteniana Blume synonym of Ceriops tagal (Perr.) C.B.Rob. 
 Ceriops globulifera Boreau ex Tul. synonym of Ceriops tagal (Perr.) C.B.Rob. 
 Ceriops lucida Miq. synonym of Ceriops tagal (Perr.) C.B.Rob. 
 Ceriops lucida var. latifolia Miq. synonym of Ceriops tagal (Perr.) C.B.Rob. 
 Ceriops lucida var. subspathulata Miq. synonym of Ceriops tagal (Perr.) C.B.Rob. 
 Ceriops mossambicensis Klotzsch synonym of Ceriops tagal (Perr.) C.B.Rob. 
 Ceriops pauciflora Benth. synonym of Ceriops tagal (Perr.) C.B.Rob. 
 Ceriops somalensis Chiov. synonym of Ceriops tagal (Perr.) C.B.Rob.  
 Ceriops timoriensis Domin synonym of Ceriops tagal (Perr.) C.B.Rob. 
 Ceriops timoriensis (DC.) C.A.Gardner synonym of Ceriops tagal (Perr.) C.B.Rob. 
 Ceriops zippeliana Blume

References

External links

Rhizophoraceae
Malpighiales genera
Mangroves